Dev Prasad Timilsena is a Nepalese Politician and serving as the Member Of House Of Representatives (Nepal) elected from Rautahat-4, Province No. 2. He is the member of Nepali Congress.

References 

Living people
Nepal MPs 2017–2022
Nepali Congress politicians from Madhesh Province
1970 births
Nepal MPs 2022–present